Sheytur (also Romanized as Sheyţūr and Shaitūr) is a village in Sabzdasht Rural District of the Central District of Bafq County, Yazd province, Iran. At the 2006 National Census, its population was 266 in 76 households. The following census in 2011 counted 534 people in 175 households. The latest census in 2016 showed a population of 258 people in 92 households; it was the largest village in its rural district.

References 

Bafq County

Populated places in Yazd Province

Populated places in Bafq County